Ephoria marginalis is a moth in the family Apatelodidae. It was described by Francis Walker in 1856. It is found in Brazil.

References

Apatelodidae
Moths described in 1856